David Nworah Ifeanyi (born 18 October 1994) is a Nigerian footballer who plays as a central midfielder .

Club career  
David Nworah Ifeanyi playing football in the streets of Onitsha in 1998. His football skills and abilities drew a lot of attention to him and afforded him the opportunity to play in some academies in the city of Onitsha and Lagos.
His footballing abilities came to prominence when he moved to the city of enugu to play for Enugu rangers international feeders team.
Before he was invited to the Nigeria national under-17 football team in 2010. 
In 2011 David Nworah Ifeanyi joined Gabros international football club currently known as Ifeanyi uba Football club and helped the team to get promotion to Nigeria National League.

Olympique safi
David Nworah ifeanyi joined Olympic Club de Safi football team in August 2012, On 18 October  2012 David Nworah Ifeanyi was given a professional contract and finished the year playing with the reserve team where he managed to score 5 goals and many assists.  David Nworah Ifeanyi  made his  first team debut for Olympic club safi in the  Botola as substitute against hassania AgadirHUSA and made an impressive performance which his team won 1–0. David Nworah received many positive comments for his performance in the match. David made his first team start In March 2014 under Coach youssef fertout, when his team was 3rd to the last of the table which many fans believed that the team may end up relegated. David Nworah  made great performance throughout the end of the season and helped his team Olympique Safi avoid relegation.

References

External links
 http://allafrica.com/stories/201511021817.html

External links
http://www.zadarskilist.hr/clanci/23092016/david-nworah-sletio-na-stanove

Nigerian footballers
1994 births
Living people
Nigerian expatriate footballers
Expatriate footballers in Malta
Expatriate soccer players in South Africa
Expatriate footballers in Morocco
Expatriate footballers in Bahrain
Expatriate footballers in Oman
Expatriate footballers in Saudi Arabia
Maltese Premier League players
Oman Professional League players
Saudi First Division League players
Botola players
Lamontville Golden Arrows F.C. players
Mosta F.C. players
Al-Orouba SC players
East Riffa Club players
Al-Ansar FC (Medina) players
Association football midfielders